Manxman will be a new-build ferry which is scheduled to enter service with the Isle of Man Steam Packet Company (IoMSPCo) in the June of 2023.

History
The ship was ordered on 31 July 2020. She is to be built by the Hyundai Mipo Dockyard, Ulsan, South Korea. Construction is scheduled to start in summer 2021. She will replace  when she enters service in spring 2023. On 1 December 2020, it was announced that the ship would be named Manxman, the third IoMSPCo vessel to bear the name. On 24 December she was laid down. She started her frist sea trials in December 2022.

References

2022 ships